Horace Finaly (30 May 1871, Budapest – 19 May 1945, New York City) French banker, was director general of the Banque de Paris et des Pays-Bas (Paribas) between 1919 and 1937. It imposed its policy and philosophy of its business by the enormous power which had directed the bank.

Biography 

He was born on 30 May 1871 in Budapest and studied at the Lycée Condorcet and passed a law degree in Paris University. He died in New York on 19 May 1945, but his remains are to Père Lachaise Cemetery in Paris, not far from where he was one of the gentlemen of the time.

See also 
 J. P. Morgan (1837–1913)
 Henri Deterding (1866–1939)

References 

 Alfred Colling, Banque et banquiers : de Babylone à Wall Street, Paris, Plon, 1962,  Notice sur Horace Finaly
 Horace Finaly, the banker, from 1871 to 1945. Bussière, Eric.

 Advanced search BNP Paribas Well of History
 Jean-Claude Daumas, Alain Chatriot, Danièle Fraboulet, Hervé Joly (dir.), Dictionnaire historique des patrons français, Paris, Flammarion, 2010.

External links 

 Horace Finaly, a banker who made his mark
 BNP Paribas – History: two centuries of banking
 Plutarchy and other tales
 1920 – 1945 Banque de Paris et des Pays-Bas
 Horace Finaly, an exceptional banker – Banque Paribas' history
 École Horace Finaly – Horace Finaly
 Horace Finaly «Le banquier du front populaire»
 Villa Finaly

French bankers
BNP Paribas people
People from Budapest
French art collectors
French philanthropists
1871 births
1945 deaths